The Cenél Conaill, or "kindred of Conall", are a branch of the Northern Uí Néill, who claim descent from Conall Gulban, son of Niall of the Nine Hostages, and allegedly the first Irish nobleman to convert to Christianity. Their kingdom was known as Tír Conaill, with their powerbase at Mag Ithe in the Finn valley, however they gradually expanded to cover what is now counties Donegal and Fermanagh. The Cenél Conaill clashed regularly with their kin the Cenél nEogain, eventually capturing the latters original power-base of Ailech in the Inishowen peninsula—in modern-day County Donegal—by the 12th century.

Below is a list of their principle clans and septs.

Cenél Luighdech (also Sil Lugdach)
The Cenél Luighdech (more commonly known as Sil Lugdach) descend from Lugaid mac Sétnai, the great-grandson of Conall Gulban. Their tribal territory extended from Dobhar (Gweedore) to the river Suilidhe (Swilly) in County Donegal. The O'Donnells and O'Dohertys who descend from this branch, were the two principal and most powerful septs of the Cenél Conaill. The most famous descendant of the Cenél Conaill is Saint Columba, who founded the monastery at Derry, and is claimed as being the grandson of Conall Gulban.

Clann Chindfaoladh
The Clann Chindfaoladh are a branch of the Cenél Luighdech and take their name from Cindfhealadh, the great-grandfather of Baighill, the eponym of this clans leading sept, the Ó Baoighill's (O'Boyle). The Ó Baoighill were chieftains of Tír Ainmireach and Tír  Boghaine in southern Donegal, with territory originally extending from Donegal town to near Kilmacreannan along the west coast. The barony of Boylagh is alleged to take its name from the O'Boyles. By the 13th century, the O'Donnells would see the O'Boyle territory divided in two; Tír Ainmireach in the south and the Three Tuatha in the north.

Clann Dálaigh 
The Clann Dálaigh (also Síl Dálaigh), or Clan Daly, is another name for the Ó Domhnaill sept of the Cenél Luighdech. This clan takes its name from Dálach, the father of Éicnechán, a chieftain of the Cenél Luighdech.

Cenél Aedha
The Cenél Aedha, or "kindred of Hugh", are descended from Aedha mac Ainmirech, great-great grandson of Conall Gulban. His father, Ainmirech mac Sétnai is brother of  Lugaid mac Sétnai, founder of the Cenél Luighdech. The Cenél Aedha are said to have given their name to the barony of Tirhugh (Tír Aedha) in County Donegal.

Cenél mBógaine

The Cenél mBógaine, or "kindred of Binny", descend from Énna Bóguine, son of Conall Gulban. The territory of the Cenél mBógaine is stated as Tír  Boghaine, which O'Donovan equates to being the barony of Banagh, and part of the barony of Boylagh in County Donegal. The Laud 610 Genealogies, compiled c.1000 AD, give seven sons for Énna Bóguine- Secht maic Bógaine .i. Áedh Cesdubh, Feidilmid, Brandubh Caech Cluassach, Anmere, Crimthan Lethan, Fergus, Eichín & Melge. However O'Clery's Book of Genealogies give a different listing- Ui. mic Enda bogaine mic Conaill gulban .i. Melge, Lugaid,Criomhthann, Anguine, Niall, Cathair. Mac don Chathair sin Caelmhaine diaruo mac an Conall errderc.

Saint Crona (Croine Bheag) is descended from the Cenél mBógaine, being 5th in lineal descent from Énna Bóguine.

Cenél Duach
The Cenél Duach, or "kindred of Duach", are named after Tigernach Duí (Duach), son of Conall Gulban. Tigernach's son Nainnid is mentioned as being at the battle of Móin Daire Lothair (modern-day Moneymore, County Londonderry) where the Northern Uí Néill defeated the Cruithin. Baedan, grandson of Tigernach through Nainnid would rule as king of Tara for one year in AD 568.

Cenél Eanna/Enda
The Cenél Eanna/Enda, or "kindred of Enda", descend from Eanna, the sixth son of Conall Gulban. They are listed as kings of Magh Ith, Tír Eanna, and Fanad in present-day County Donegal, a territory around the southern tip of Inishowen.

Ó Breasláin
The Ó Breasláin of Fánad (Fanat) descend from the Cenél Enda branch of the Cenél Conaill via descent from Fergus Fanad.

Linked Septs

See also
Northern Uí Néill
Branches of the Cenél nEógain
Tyrconnell

Bibliography
Robert Bell (1988). "The Book of Ulster Surnames", The Black Staff Press

References

Connachta
Uí Néill
Gaels